The stripe-backed antbird (Myrmorchilus strigilatus) is a species of bird in the family Thamnophilidae. It is monotypic within the genus Myrmorchilus. It is found in Argentina, Bolivia, Brazil and Paraguay, where its natural habitat is subtropical or tropical dry forests.

The genus Myrmorchilus was erected by the American ornithologist Robert Ridgway in 1909.

References

Thamnophilidae
Birds of Argentina
Birds of Bolivia
Birds of the Caatinga
Birds of the Pantanal
Birds of Paraguay
Birds described in 1831
Taxonomy articles created by Polbot